Banner Township, Kansas may refer to the following places in Kansas:

 Banner Township, Dickinson County, Kansas
 Banner Township, Jackson County, Kansas
 Banner Township, Rush County, Kansas
 Banner Township, Smith County, Kansas
 Banner Township, Stevens County, Kansas

See also 
 List of Kansas townships
 Banner Township (disambiguation)

Kansas township disambiguation pages